VT10 may refer to:
 Torpedo Squadron 10 or "VT-10" was a torpedo bomber squadron of the United States Navy from 1942 to 1945.
 Training Squadron 10 or "VT-10" is a training squadron of the United States Navy.
 Vermont Route 10 or "VT 10" is a state highway located in Windsor County, Vermont, United States.